KBC Group is a Belgian universal multi-channel bank-insurer, focusing on private clients and small and medium-sized enterprises in Belgium, Bulgaria, Czech Republic, Hungary, and Slovakia. It was created in 1998 through the merger of Kredietbank (KB), the cooperative , ABB Insurance, and Fidelitas Insurance. The acronym KBC refers to KredietBank and CERA.

KBC Group is one of Belgium's major companies and the second largest bancassurer in the country. As of late 2020, it was the 15th largest bank in Europe by market capitalisation and a major financial player in Central and Eastern Europe, employing some 41,000 staff (of which more than half in Central and Eastern Europe) and serving 12 million customers worldwide (some 7 to 8 million in Central and Eastern Europe). KBC is a Forbes Global 2000 company.

The group is controlled by a group of core shareholders, and has a free float of approximately 60%. Its shares are traded on the Euronext exchange in Brussels.

Background

Volksbank van Leuven, local savings banks and Middenkredietkas

In the early 1890s, the Boerenbond farmers movement, similarly inspired by Catholicsm and corporatism and also based in Leuven, led the development of burgeoning network of rural cooperative banks inspired by the model created in Germany by Friedrich Wilhelm Raiffeisen. The first of these  ("savings and loans associations") was created in 1892 in the village of  near Aarschot. In 1902, the network had grown to 190 local savings banks, and would further expand to 378 by 1913 and 1099 in 1934. In 1903, the Middenkredietkas decided to reduce its exclusive dependence on the CGER and established a permanent relationship with the Volksbank van Leuven for the management of some of the farmers' savings.

Algemene Bankvereeniging, Bank voor Handel en Nijverheid, Almanij

After World War I, the Middenkredietkas strengthened its structural cooperation with the Volksbank van Leuven, which in 1919 had transformed itself into a joint-stock company. The two institutions jointly sponsored the creation or acquired control of several other banks in Dutch-speaking Belgium, including the Algemeene Bankvereeniging (ABV, "General Banking Association"), founded in 1921 in Antwerp, and two banks named  (BHN, "Bank for Trade and Industry") respectively in Ghent and Kortrijk. On , ABV and the Volksbank van Leuven merged. The latter combination resulted in the creation in 1931 of the holding company Almanij in Antwerp, which received a number of industrial company stakes. As a consequence, the Boerenbond-controlled banking cluster became one of Belgium's largest credit institutions, able to rival the Banque de Bruxelles and Generale Bank. The Boerentoren high-rise building in Antwerp, financed by ABV, was the second-tallest skyscraper in Europe at the time of its completion in 1931, just behind Madrid's Telefónica Building (1929). It became the symbol of the Boerengroup's financial might, to the dismay of some of the Catholic clergy including Cardinal Jozef-Ernest van Roey who feared that the farmers' movement was drifting away from its religious roots and towards commercialism.

Kredietbank

The restructuring, including a reimbursement of depositors that would only be completed in 1963, was directly managed by the Belgian government and led by Albert-Édouard Janssen. The Kredietbank was registered in Antwerp but its actual head office was established in Brussels. Fernand Collin, who became its president in 1938, defined the Kredietbank as an independent bank with a decidedly Flemish character which would be an instrument to further Flemish economic growth.

In 1943, Almanij, which had become Kredietbank's majority owner during the 1935 restructuring, underwent a capital increase. As a consequence, the Middenkredietkas (in liquidation) became a minority shareholder, and the control of the group was transferred to a group of families later known as the "Almanij Syndicate", which by the 1970s included Collin and André Vlerick, a son-in-law of Gustave Sap who had been associated with the Algemeene Bankvereeniging since its creation.

In 1949, Kredietbank established its first international subsidiary, Kredietbank SA Luxembourg (known as KBL). In 1951, Kredietbank's shares began listing on the Brussels Stock Exchange, even though Almanij retained control. In 1952, Kredietbank expanded into the Belgian Congo by establishing a branch in Léopoldville, then in 1954 acquired  and renamed it Kredietbank-Congo. That operation grew into four branches, in Léopoldville (now Kinshasa), Bukavu, Elizabethville (now Lubumbashi), and Stanleyville (now Kisangani), but was discontinued in 1966 following Belgian Congolese independence in 1960. In 1958, Kredietbank expanded into Wallonia through the acquisition of local banks, which it merged in 1961 into a newly formed subsidiary named . Kredietbank further built up its international network in the late 1960s, with the opening of offices in New York and Mexico City, then in Johannesburg, Melbourne, Atlanta, Tehran, Tokyo, Madrid, and Los Angeles, and branches in New York, London, the Cayman Islands, and a subsidiary in Geneva. In 1970, together with six other European institutions, Kredietbank established the Inter-Alpha Group of Banks.

In 1979, controlling ownership of KBL was transferred from Kredietbank directly to Almanij. In 1996, KBL absorbed . In 1997, Kredietbank expanded into Hungary through the privatization of K&H Bank.

ABB and CERA

In 1941, its insurance operations developed since the late 19th century were renamed  (ABB, "Belgian Farmers' Union Insurance") and in the following decades became one of the largest Belgian insurers.

The number of Belgian Raiffeisen banks was about 800 in the early 1970s, then further decreased through consolidation to reach 218 in 1996. In the mid-1980s, a new legal framework led to the creation in 1986 of CERA Bank as a fully-fledged central banking entity.

1998 Merger and subsequent history

On , CERA Bank, ABB, and Fidelitas (the insurance arm of Almanij) merged into Kredietbank NV, whose name was changed to KB ABB Cera Bank and Insurance Holding Company NV. On , the group's parent entity was renamed KBC Bank and Insurance Holding Company NV. On , that was shortened to KBC Group NV simultaneously with merger with Almanij, the former holding company.

In 1999, KBC acquired majority control of Československá obchodní banka, a prominent bank in the Czech Republic and Slovakia. By 2007, it had made further acquisitions in Bulgaria (DZI Insurance, DZI Invest and EIBANK), Romania (KBC Securities Romania, Romstal Leasing and INK Insurance Broker), Russia (Absolut Bank), and Serbia (KBC Banka and Senzal, Hipobroker, and Bastion). In 2008, it purchased Istrobanka in Slovakia from BAWAG.

During the late-2000s financial crisis the stock price dropped from 106€ on 18 May 2007 to 5€ on 6 March 2009, a loss of 95% over a period of 22 months. The bank needed and received support from the Flemish government for an amount of 3.5 billion Euros. After the crisis the bank embarked on a divestment programme to satisfy the requirements of the European Commission. As such, it sold several subsidiaries, including Centea, Fidea, Kredyt Bank, ADB, KBC Deutschland, Absolut Bank and KBL European Private Bankers, the latter being acquired by Precision Capital, owned by Hamad bin Jassim bin Jaber Al Thani, for a reported €1.05 billion in October 2011 and renamed Quintet Private Bank in 2020. The divestment programme was completed in 2014 and the state aid entirely paid back by 2015, five years ahead of the agreed schedule. Since then the KBC share price recovered to around a maximum of €75 in the month of January 2022.

In 2017, KBC acquired United Bulgarian Bank (UBB) and Interlease in Bulgaria. In February 2017, Ireland was defined as a new core market of KBC Group, but in April 2021, KBC entered into talks with Bank of Ireland to sell its performing loan book and announced its intention to withdraw from Ireland. As of 2022, the KBC group is focused on five countries: Belgium, Bulgaria, Czech Republic, Hungary, and Slovakia.

Structure and main subsidiaries

KBC Group NV is the direct parent company of:
KBC Bank NV
KBC Insurance NV

All other KBC Group companies are direct or indirect subsidiaries of these. The main ones are shown in the table:

BEL = Belgium Business Unit, CZR = Czech Republic Business Unit, IMA = International Markets Business Unit, GRP = Group Centre.

KBC Bank NV
KBC Bank is the main subsidiary. Its first home market is Belgium, where it is one of the top three banks, with a 20-25% market share and over three million customers (counting the customers of the subsidiaries in Belgium).
Its second home market is Central Europe, served via subsidiaries and investments in the Czech Republic (ČSOB), Slovakia (ČSOB and OTP Banka), Hungary (K&H Bank) and Bulgaria (CIBank and UBB Bank). In all of these countries, KBC Bank is a leading player by market share.
It also has a substantial presence in Ireland through its subsidiary KBC Bank Ireland (formerly IIB Bank), which is a major player in both the corporate and residential mortgage markets there. In all, KBC Bank has established a presence in some thirty countries around the globe.

KBC Project Finance is a subsidiary of KBC Bank, and has been an active player in the non-recourse financing of projects since the early 1990s. Headquartered in Dublin, it also has professionals based in London, Brussels, New York, Hong Kong, and Sydney. Its main business lines are Energy and Infrastructure. This includes financing projects in sectors such as the oil & gas industry, power, renewable energy, and Public-Private Partnership. It has a portfolio in excess of US$5bn, financing approximately 250 projects worldwide.

KBC Bank also has investment banking operations in Europe, US and Asia. A specialist arm called KBC Financial Products operates primarily in global convertible bonds; its branch in Japan is called KBC Securities Japan, which specialises in secondary equity broking, convertible bonds, warrants, and equity derivatives.

Notable buildings associated with KBC

Leuven

In 1925, the bank annexed the former Hotel d'Eynatten on nearby Eikstraat to be the residence of the bank's director. The complex, later enlarged at the corner of Boekhandelstraat, was purchased by CERA in 2007 from the City of Leuven as its headquarters, for which it erected an award-winning new corner building completed in 2018.

Antwerp

 The former head office of Algemeene Bankvereeniging in Antwerp was a 19th-century mansion reconverted as bank headquarters in 1921–1922 on a design by architect .
 The Boerentoren or "KBC Tower" in Antwerp was erected by Algemeene Bankvereeniging in 1931, initially mostly as a residential building. It was transformed into offices in the late 1960s and used by Kredietbank, then KBC from the 1970s to the 2010s. 
  The former seat of Almanij in Antwerp, in the historic Snyderhuis (or Snijdershuis) adjacent to Rockox House on Keizerstraat, is now offices of KBC's Private Banking division.

Kortrijk
 The art deco former seat of Bank voor Handel en Nijverheid on Leiestraat 21 in Kortrijk has been repurposed as an annex of Kortrijk City Hall.

Brussels

It was acquired by Volksbank van Leuven from the Belgian state in 1928, following the post-WWI termination of Deutsche Bank's activity in Belgium, and revamped for ABV by architect  in 1929–1932.
 The art deco  on Rue des Poissoniers / Visverkopersstraat 13 in Brussels, designed by architect  and completed in 1931
 The current head office of KBC Group and KBC Bank on Havenlaan 2 in Brussels, was erected in the 1990s to consolidate teams that had been scattered in numerous locations in the city.

Art collection

The private art collection of KBC is situated in the Rockox House in Antwerp.

Awards

In 2019, Harvard Business Review ranked KBC's CEO Johan Thijs as the 8th best performing CEO in the world.

Controversy

Support for apartheid in South Africa

One of Kredietbank's main shareholders in the postwar period, André Vlerick, was actively involved in public advocacy of the Apartheid-promoting regime of South Africa and support of its circumvention of sanctions.

In April 2018, NGO OpenSecrets, in partnership with the Centre for Applied Legal Studies (CALS) at the Georgetown University Law Center, filed a complaint at the OECD, claiming that KBC and KBL had violated the Organization's Guidelines for Multinational Enterprises in their dealings with South Africa between 1977 and 1994. According to the complaint, KBC and KBL together "were responsible for facilitating up to 70% of all illegal arms transactions that allowed the apartheid government to secretly buy weapons despite mandatory UN arms sanctions." As part of that process, OpenSecrets and CALS submitted a detailed document to the OECD contact points in Belgium and Luxembourg to support their claim. At the same time, hearings were held on the matter at South Africa's People's Tribunal on Economic Crime led by Zak Yacoob in Johannesburg.

Terms of the 1998 merger

In December 1999, the Brussels commercial court ordered CERA Holding to pay an additional 2.48 billion euros to its cooperative shareholders, based on the finding that their contribution had been undervalued in the 1998 merger.

Investment in coal

KBC has been criticised for its investment policies regarding fossil fuels. According to a 2015 report by Belgian NGO Fairfin KBC invested US$2.4 billion between 2004 and 2014 through loans and emitting shares and obligations. In contrast the money allocated to renewable energy was only US$929 million.

When KBC reviewed its sustainability policy in 2016, the Global Network of Non-governmental organisation cooperating in the field of private banks and sustainability, Banktrack published an analysis acknowledging progress made on fossil fuels, while criticising the exception for the Czech Republic where the bank continues to finance coal, saying “the new general restriction on coal is welcome and positive, however the exception applied to Czech coal companies is concerning."

In 2017 the Belgian Climate Coalition published a report charting the investments in fossil fuel of the four major banks in Belgium (KBC, ING, BNP Paribas and Belfius). In this report they attacked the exception for the Czech Republic as well,saying “the exceptions for coal activities in the Czech Republic don’t comply with the strict deadlines imposed by climate science.”

See also

 Paul Borghgraef
 Fernand Collin
 Luc Debaillie
 Frank Donck
 Gustave Sap
 Jozef Van Waeyenberge
 Remi Vermeiren, former president
 Philippe Vlerick

References

 Van der Wee, Herman and Van der Wee-Verbreyt, Monique, People Make History: The Kredietbank and the Economic Rise of Flanders, 1935-1985, Brussels, Kredietbank, 1985.

External links
 

Financial services companies established in 1935
Banks established in 1935
Banks of Belgium
Companies based in Brussels
Companies listed on Euronext Brussels
Investment banks
Investment management companies of Belgium
Multinational companies headquartered in Belgium
Belgian brands
Banks under direct supervision of the European Central Bank